Call of the West is a 1930 American pre-Code Western film directed by Albert Ray and starring Dorothy Revier, Matt Moore and Tom O'Brien.

Cast
 Dorothy Revier as Violet La Tour
 Matt Moore as Lon Dixon
 Kathrin Clare Ward as Ma Dixon
 Tom O'Brien as Bull Clarkson
 Alan Roscoe as Maurice Kane
 Victor Potel as Trig Peters
 Nick De Ruiz as Frijoles
 Joe De La Cruz as Mexicali
 Blanche Rose as Mrs. Burns
 Gertrude Bennett as Kit
 Connie La Mont as Doll
 Buff Jones as Red
 Bud Osborne as Rustler

References

Bibliography
 Pitts, Michael R. Western Movies: A Guide to 5,105 Feature Films. McFarland, 2012.

External links
 

1930 films
1930 Western (genre) films
American Western (genre) films
Films directed by Albert Ray
American black-and-white films
Columbia Pictures films
1930s English-language films
1930s American films